Tarbox is a surname. Notable persons with that name include:

 Barb Tarbox (1961–2003), Canadian activist
 Charles Tarbox (1891–1978), English cricketer
 E. D. Hill (born 1961 as Edith Ann Tarbox), American businessperson and journalist
 Elmer Tarbox (1916–1987), American military aviator, businessman, and politician
 Increase N. Tarbox (1815–1888), American theologian and author
 John K. Tarbox (1838–1887), American politician
 Katie Tarbox, American author
 Michael Tarbox (born 1956), American singer-songwriter and guitarist